Ruslan Sabirly (born September 16, 1979), also known as Ruslan Sabirli is an actor, producer, film director, songwriter, founder and director of Booktrailer Festival and the first Azerbaijani mentalist. He is the first to introduce the terms and concepts - “Book Trailer” and “Mentalism” in Azerbaijan. He is the first celebrity in Azerbaijan, who have got Facebook and Odnoklassniki profiles verified.

Biography 
Ruslan Sabirly was born on September 16, 1979 in Sumgait city.

He studied in general education schools No.13 (grades 1-5), No.36 (grades 6-7) and No.41 (grades 8-11). At school, Ruslan performed in various events as a musician and mentalist. After school, he entered Sumgayit State University and during his education performed as a musician-arranger, mentalist and event hoster on the university stage and in various city events.

After graduating with Bachelor's and master's degrees, he got a PhD and defended his thesis on “Multicontrolling Neural Networks”.

Later, he studied Project Management in Ukraine and became International Certified Project Manager of Level C (IPMA Level C 0100428) by International Project Management Association.

In 2009, he was a co-founder of the Azerbaijan office of the International Organization for the Exchange of Schoolchildren (Pupil)  - Youth For Understanding - YFU.

Career 
He began his career by playing in TV commercials. His first role was in TV series “Mother-in-law”.

In 2013-2014, he established a news site dedicated to cinema - www.cinemanews.az.

In 2013-2014, he established the CNC (Cinematographic National Center) Film School.

In 2014, he left for Germany to study acting and producing films.

Since 2016, he has been a member of the jury of the Booktrailer Festival, which is held annually with the support of the Ministry of Culture of the Azerbaijan Republic.

Music 
Ruslan Sabirly began studying music when he was 10 years old. He has a secondary music education, graduated from the classes of the national musical instrument tar. Parallel to this, he studied piano and performed on the school stage as a keyboard-musician. He wrote his first musical composition - “Forgive me, if I leave” at the age of 17.

Filmography

Discography 

 Getsəm, bağışla (1996, release year: 2016)
 Yaz Xatirələri (2009, release year: 2014)
 Mələklə bir gün (2010, release year: 2016)
 Zirvə (2016, release year: 2017)

Event host 
 2018 — III Booktrailer Festival Award Ceremony. Co-host — Leyla Aliyeva (presenter).
 2018 — "Azerbaijan Golden Kids Awards 2018". Co-host — Letafet Alekperova.
 2019 — IV Booktrailer Festival Award Ceremony. Co-host — Leyla Aliyeva (presenter).
 2019 — "Azerbaijan Golden Kids Awards 2019". Co-host — Leyla Aliyeva (presenter).
 2022 — "Musical Projector" Multimedia Show of "Avanqard" Camera Orchestra.

TV host

Awards 

 1997-1999 - Awarded the honorary scholarship for the honorary student named after Jeykhun Vakhabov during his education.
 1999 - Elected representative to the II Youth Forum.
 2002 - Elected representative to the III Youth Forum.
 2002 - Awarded with an honorary diploma of the Committee of Free Trade Union Workers of Education of the Azerbaijan Republic for fruitful work in the trade union bodies.
 2013 - Awarded "TOP-20 most stylish Azerbaijani actors and actresses".
 2020 - Awarded "TOP-20 most charismatic Azerbaijani movie actors".

References

External links 
 

1979 births
Living people
Entertainers from Baku
Mentalists
21st-century Azerbaijani male actors
People from Sumgait